Events from the year 1710 in Russia

Incumbents
 Monarch – Peter I

Events

 Founding of the Alexander Nevsky Lavra
 Founding of Pushkin, Saint Petersburg
 Siege of Viborg
 Capitulation of Estonia and Livonia
 Pruth River Campaign
Founding of the Trångsund Fortress

Births

Deaths

References

 
Years of the 18th century in Russia